Clinton Bennett (born 7 October 1955, Staffordshire, England) is a British–American scholar of Religious studies and participant in interfaith dialogue, specializing in Islamic studies and the relations between Islam and other religions. As an ordained Baptist Christian minister, he was a Christian missionary in Bangladesh and other Muslim-majority countries before serving as the second director of Interfaith relations at the British Council of Churches in succession to Kenneth Cracknell. Bennett has also taken part in the dialogue activities of the World Council of Churches.

He graduated at the Universities of Manchester, Birmingham, and Oxford. He has held several academic appointments in the United Kingdom and the United States, where he became a naturalized U.S. citizen in 2012. He currently writes for various publications and teaches part-time at the State University of New York at New Paltz. He is a Fellow of the Royal Asiatic Society, the Royal Anthropological Institute, and the Committee for the Scientific Examination of Religion. He has authored academic books, chapters in books, journal articles, and encyclopedia entries. Ahmad Shafaat writes, "Bennett's approach allows him to treat Islamic traditions and their Muslim interpretations with sensitivity and respect, not often found among Christian writings on Islam."

Biography

Background

Bennett was born in Tettenhall, then an urban district in Staffordshire, England. After gaining his School Certificate, he worked in Sydney as an officer in the state civil service 1972–1973.

Education

Career
 Since 2012 he has served as section editor for North Europe with the Birmingham University based project Christian-Muslim Relations: A Bibliographical History and is currently also Western Europe Team Leader. The volumes are published by Brill Publishers.

Teaching

Involvement in the World Council of Churches

Bennett was a Consultant at the Baar Meeting of the WCC's Dialogue Sub Unit (1988) and a member of the Sub Unit's Working Party that drafted  Issues in Christian Muslim Relations: Ecumenical Considerations (1991). 1992 until 1998 he was a member of the World Council of Churches' Consultation on the Church and the Jewish People (CCJP) representing the Baptist Union of Great Britain, attending meetings in Geneva (1992) and Budapest (1994).

Voluntary service

He is a member of the International Advisory Board of FOREF-Europe (Forum for Religious Freedom).

Links with the Indian subcontinent and the Muslim world

Victorian Images of Islam

Bennett's Victorian Images of Islam (1992) has been widely cited.   For example, by Kate Zebiri (1997), Rollin Armour (2003) Hugh Goddard (2000) and  Dana L. Robert (2008). Armour refers to the work of Bennett and of such scholars as Bernard Lewis and John Esposito as lying "behind almost every page that follows" (2003: xiv). David Thomas described the book as an "illuminating study into an overlooked corner of Victorian religious history". In particular, it showed that more diversity of approach existed among earlier contributors but that more often than not it is a priori premises rather than encounter that determine attitude Bennett described contributors as confrontational or conciliatory, analysing the work of three scholars in each category. The three conciliators were Charles Forster, Frederick Denison Maurice and Reginald Bosworth Smith and the three confrontationalists were William Muir, William St. Clair Tisdall and John Drew Bate. Conciliators were those "Western writers who questioned the prevailing attitude of cultural and religious superiority that led to a belittling of everything non-European" Confrontationalists perpetuated traditional anti-Muslim polemic. Bennett later commented that while "actual meetings between Christians and Muslims may result in a change of heart and mind ... more often than not ... it confirms our prejudices, which it has to be said is one of the biggest problems involved in Christian-Muslim encounter." He stresses, though, that the story of Christian-Muslim encounter includes examples of harmonious co-existence as well as of hostility. By remembering these experiences we can ensure that future relations are not solely defined by a negative historical memory.  Ahmad Gunney called the book "a valuable contribution to the debate on the important question of Islam and the West" and said that  "the Baptist minister" had to a "certain extent" complemented "the work of three Muslim writers, M. A. Anees, Syed Z. Abedin and Z. Sardar" whose book had been published by the same publisher as Bennett's. Like Thomas, Gunney remarked that Bennett's research showed that even when people are "technically well equipped" and spend "extensive periods of residence in the countries of the world of Islam" this does "not necessarily lead to objective judgements, especially if one starts off, as in the case of the three confrontational writers with a priori assumptions about Islam." Andrews, a Shi'a Muslim, suggested that the book's study by Muslim Imams-in-training might "go some way towards breaking down barriers and misconceptions" and observed that "through his own enlightened position" Bennett "has done a lot to undermine at least one Muslim's preconceptions about Christian missionaries, and about Baptist missionaries in particular".

"In Search of" books

He argued that no researcher is neutral and that we all need to engage in reflexivity to guard against bias and the imposition of a priori presuppositions, so that, as a reviewer commented, "suddenly the act of observation becomes the subject of observation" and "for a teacher like Bennett, his own experience as an ordained minister and missionary, his own experience with the give and take of ecumenical teaching becomes the data of religious thought". "Bennett", Dening continued, "is not independent of all the observations made through centuries of thought", so "there is convergence: library and field, intellect and emotion, thought and experience in the end come together". The book, said this reviewer, helped "to make the exposition of more than a hundred years of thought on the study of religions lucid and memorable". Alan Race, in another review, described the book as cutting "through a dense thicket, yielding a clear, highly readable survey of how" anthropology and Religious Studies "have interacted and failed to interact", although remarking that it mainly discussed European history. Bennett followed this in 1998 with In Search of Muhammad and in 2001 with In Search of Jesus: Insider and Outsider Images. A. G Noorani describes In Search of Muhammad as "an earnest effort by a devout Christian to understand Muhammad, and places" Bennett "in the ranks of others whose services Minou Reeves  acknowledges in her survey of Western writing on Muhammad." Commenting on Bennett's discussion of the sources available for the life of Muhammad, Hugh Goddard says that while he is "not as negative" as "some modern Western scholars", neither "is he uncritical of them", suggesting that "some traditions, particularly concerning Muhammad's miracles and the role of women, should be judged as unreliable." Referring to Bennett's attempt to suggest how "Christ and Muhammad might be viewed as somehow complementary, rather than as rivals" he called this a "brave attempt" even though "there are no easy answers to such a significant question." Citations include Gerard Rixhon, who says that he makes "words of Bennett's" his "own "when he wrote his searching book on Muhammad" and aimed "to hear Muslim voices."
Timothy Johnson, ABC News chief medical correspondent, who is also an ordained minister of the Evangelical Covenant Church, refers to Bennett as "a fine scholar and student of world religions", and recommends In Search of Jesus as "an amazing compendium of the many attempts to capture the story of Jesus by both insiders (those who claim to be Christians) and outsiders (those of other religious traditions)." "You can", he continues, "look up almost any writer on the subject of Jesus and find a brief but fair summary of the person's writing and point of view ... It is a great one stop source of quick summary information." The fourth 'In Search of' book, In Search of Solutions: The Problem of Religion and Conflict appeared in 2008 as part of a series edited by Rosemary Radford Ruether and Lisa Isherwood. The fifth, In Search of Understanding: Reflections on Christian Engagement with Muslims after Four Decades, published in 2019, reprises some of Bennett's earlier writing and attempts to offer some suggestions on how congregations might rethink their ideas about Muslims and cooperate with them in peace and justice advocacy, and social and community development. Ataullah Siddiqui, who wrote the Foreword, comments, "Bennett’s treatment of the subject is never dull and is always rewarding. His handling of the issues central to Christian-Muslim relations reveals a reflective mind that is not satisfied with the soporific effects of ‘relaxed’ dialogue. He enquires, investigates, and challenges where necessary, and proposes new avenues in order to explore future relations.”

Selected publications

Books

 1992, Victorian Images of Islam, London: Grey Seal, pp 204; republished 2009, Piscataway, NJ: Gorgias Press
 1996, In Search of the Sacred: Anthropology and the Study of Religions  London: Cassell Academic ( hb; 0304 336823 pb) pp 218
 1996, with Foreman-Peck, Lorraine  and Higgins, Chris, Researching  Into Teaching Methods in Colleges and Universities, London: Kogan Page pp 136, republished 2013 by Routledge
 1998, In Search of Muhammad, London: Cassell Academic pp 276.
 2001, In Search of Jesus: Insider – Outsider Images London: Continuum pp 364
 2005, Muslims and Modernity: An Introduction to the Issues and Debates, London: Continuum pp 286
 2008, Understanding Christian Muslim Relations Past and Present, London: Continuum
 2008, In Search of Solutions: the problem of religion and  conflict, London: Equinox, republished 2014 by Routledge
 2009, Interpreting the Qur'an: A Guide for the Uninitiated, London: Continuum
 2010, Studying Islam: The Critical Issues, London: Continuum
 2010, Muslim Women of Power: Gender, Politics and Culture in Islam, London: Continuum
 2012, South Asian Sufis: Devotion, Deviation and Destiny, edited with Charles M. Ramsey, London: Continuum
 2013, Bloomsbury Companion to Islamic Studies, (editor) London: Bloomsbury
 2017, Sufism, Pluralism and Democracy, edited with Sarwar Alam, Equinox, Sheffield
 2019, In Search of Understanding: Reflections on Christian Engagement with Muslims after Four Decades, Eugene, OR: Wipf and Stock

Chapters

 1994, "Islam", pp 95 – 122, in J Holm with J Bowker (ed) Making Moral Decisions, London: Pinter.
 1994, "Islam", pp 113 – 141, in J Holm with J Bowker (ed), Picturing God, London: Pinter.
 1994, "Islam", pp 88 –114, in J Holm with J Bowker, Sacred Place, London: Pinter.
 1994, "Islam", pp 90 – 112, in J Holm with J Bowker (ed), Rites of Passage, London: Pinter.
 1997, "Islam and Muhammad Iqbal," pp 127 – 143 in Modern Spiritualities: An Inquiry, ed Brown, Laurence, Farr, Bernard C and Hoffmann, Joseph R, Amherst, NY, Prometheous.
 2008, "A Christian response to the Absence of the Cross in Islam", 171–179, in David Emmanuel Singh (ed) Jesus and the Cross:   Reflections of Christians from Islamic Contexts, Oxford; Carlisle, Cumbria and Waynesboro, GA: Regnum/Paternoster.
 2009, "W. R. W. Stephens, Christianity and Islam", xxxiii – xxvii, in W. R. W Stephens and Clinton Bennett, Christianity and Islam: The Bible and the Koran, NY: Gorgias Press.
 2010, "Subdivisions in Islam," pp 129–147 and "Mystical Islam," pp 148–150 in Marshall Cavendish Reference, Islamic beliefs, practices, and cultures, Tarrytown, NY: Marshall Cavendish Reference..
 2011, "States, Politics and Political Groups," 144–163, "Focus on Al-Qaeda," 164–167, "Islamism in the 21st Century," 192–215, in Marshall Cavendish Reference, Modern Muslim Societies, Tarrytown, NY: Marshall Cavendish Reference.
 2011, "Saints, Incarnation and Christian-Muslim Relations: Reflections inspired by encountering Bangladeshi Islam", 99–111, in David Emmanuel Singh (ed)Jesus and the Incarnation: Reflections of Christians from Islamic Contexts. Oxford: Regnum Books.
 2013, "Muslim Ideas about the 'Resurrection,'"155-162, in David Emmanuel Singh (ed) Jesus and the Resurrection: Reflections of Christians from Islamic Contexts, Oxford: Regnum Books
 2014, "Empires and Religions: Colonialism, Postcolonialism, and Orientalism," in Paul Hedges (ed), Controversies in Contemporary Religion: Education, Law, Politics, Society and Spirituality, Volume 1, 273-302, Santa Barbara, CA: ABC-CLIO
 2015, "Christian-Muslim Relations in the USA: A Postmodern Analysis after 9/11," 151-166 in Paul Hedges (ed) Contemporary Muslim-Christian Encounters: Developments, Diversity and Dialogue, London: Bloomsbury
 2017, "Christians and Muḥammad," pp. 296-303, and "Christian Minorities in Islamic Contexts," pp. 349-357, in Routledge Handbook on Christian-Muslim Relations, ed. David Thomas, London, Routledge
 2017, "Anabaptist Promotion of Church State Separation," 757-759, "Emancipation of Jews in France," 823-824, "Emancipation of Jews in Germany," 862-863 in F. Curta, Great events in religion: An encyclopedia of pivotal events in religious history, Santa Barbara, CA, ABC-CLIO
 2018, "Education of Religious Minorities in Muslim Countries," pp. 377-387 in Handbook on Islamic Education, ed. Holger Daun and Reza Arjmand, Springer: Dordrecht
 2019, "Syncretistic Sufi Gnosticism in South and South East Asia," pp. 595-602 in The Gnostic World, ed. Garry W Trompf, Gunner B. Mikklesten, and Jay Johnston, London: Routledge
 2019, "Promoting Social and Religious Harmony: Bāul’s origin and migration West and Roji Sarker’s performance in the British Bangladeshi Diaspora," pp. 72-92 in Cultural Fusion of Sufi Islam: Alternative Paths to Mystical Faith ed. Sarwar Alam, Abingdon: Routledge
 2019, "William Brackney – Linking Baptist Genetics, Human Rights, and Openness to the Salvation of All," pp 56-72, in Crossing Baptist Boundaries: a Festschrift in Honor of William Henry Brackney, ed. Erich Geldback, Macon, GA: Mercer University Press

Articles

 1992, "The Legacy of Henry Martyn" pp 10–15, International Bulletin of Missionary Research, Vol 16 No 1.
 1993, "The Legacy of Lewis Bevan Jones" pp 126–129, International Bulletin of Missionary Research, Vol 17 No 3.
 1996, "The Legacy of Karl Gottlieb Pfander" pp 76 – 81, International Bulletin of Missionary Research, Vol 20 No 2

Notes

Bibliography

 Anderson, Gerald H (ed) (1998) Biographical Dictionary of Christian Missions, NY, Simon & Schuster Macmillan
 Contemporary Authors (1997) "Bennett, Clinton" Vol. 157, p 20, Detroit, MI: Gale Research, 
 New World Encyclopedia: Selected Articles (2008) "Project Contributors: Clinton Bennett", p 462, 2008  (editor-in-chief Frank Kaufmann), St. Paul, MN: Paragon House available at Clinton Bennett
 Gellner, David (1996) "Review of Clinton Bennett's In Search of the Sacred", 46-7, Discernment, new series 3: 2
 Riddell, Peter G (2006) "Review of Clinton Bennett's Muslims and Modernity with Islam in Britain (Institute for the Study of Islam and Christianity) and Bill Musk's Kissing Cousins? Christians and Muslims face to face", Church Times, 2 June

External links
Clinton Bennett’s Home Page
Critical Review of In Search of Muhammad by Jay Smith
Ahmad Shafaat's review of In Search of Muhammad and In Search of Jesus.
Bennett's Legacy of Henry Martyn.
Bennett's Beyond Religious Discord.
 Review of Bennett's Understanding Christian-Muslim Relations

1955 births
Living people
20th-century English writers
20th-century English male writers
21st-century English writers
Alumni of the University of Birmingham
Alumni of the University of Manchester
Alumni of the University of Oxford
American people of British descent
British expatriate academics in the United States
Christian scholars of Islam
English Baptist ministers
Fellows of the Royal Asiatic Society
Marist College faculty
People associated with Aston University
People from Wolverhampton
Religion academics
State University of New York at New Paltz faculty
People educated at Northern Baptist College
Academics of the Institute of Continuing Education